Tan Sri Dato' Sri (Dr.)  Mohamad Norza Zakaria (born in 1966) is a Malaysian chartered accountant and a fellow of CPA Australia. He is the President of Olympic Council of Malaysia (OCM) and also hold the post of President of Commonwealth Games Association of Malaysia. Norza is currently the President of Badminton Association of Malaysia (BAM) which has propelled Malaysia to the world stage of badminton. Norza is also a board member of National Sports Council (NSC) and Chairman of Audit Committee of NSC from 2018 until present.

Norza was also appointed by the OCM as the Chef de Mission (CDM) of Malaysia for the 28th Southeast Asian Games which was held from 5–16 June 2015 in Singapore.

Along with his passion and enthusiasm for the game of polo, Norza has been appointed as President of The Royal Malaysian Polo Association (RMPA) for 2021 / 2022 and he is also the President of the Putra Polo Club.

Early life and educational background
Norza is the son of school teachers and was born in Malacca and grew up in Negeri Sembilan.  After his studies in Sekolah Tuanku Jaafar in Kuala Pilah, Negeri Sembilan, he received his Higher School of Certificate from the Randwick Boys High School in Australia in 1985.

A Chartered Accountant (CA) from the Malaysian Institute of Accountants (MIA) by profession, Norza studied and received his Bachelor of Commerce in Accounting from the University of Wollongong in Australia from 1986 to 1988.

In 2008, Norza qualified as a Fellow of CPA Australia (FCPA) from CPA Australia Ltd.

Professional background
As a Chartered accountant, Norza started his career with Arthur Andersen & Co, and held managerial, executive and high level positions with Bank Negara Malaysia, Petronas, SPK Sentosa, Mun Loong Berhad and Gabungan Strategik Sdn Bhd.

Norza sits on board of a public listed company (PLC) in Malaysia, Citaglobal Berhad, and was appointed as an Executive Chairman & President of the company since May 2020. He is also the Group President & CEO of TIZA Global Sdn Bhd, a company he started in 2008 that has a wide diversity of business holdings from oil and gas, hospitality, transportation and media technology. He is also apart of the board members in AirAsia Aviation Group Ltd.

Previously, Norza has been appointed as the board of directors and Chairman of Audit Committee of a government linked PLCs, namely Bintulu Port Holdings Berhad, Samalaju Industrial Port Sdn Bhd, Lembaga Urusan Tabung Haji, Institut Terjemahan Negara Malaysia, PT XL Axiata Tbk (formerly known as PT Excelcomindo Pratama Tbk), Pelikan International Corporation Berhad, TH Heavy Engineering Berhad, Tropicana Corporation Berhad and TH Plantations Berhad.

Honours
  :
  Commander of the Order of Loyalty to the Crown of Malaysia (PSM) - Tan Sri (2020)
  :
  Grand Commander of the Order of the Territorial Crown (SMW) - Datuk Seri (2015)
  :
  Knight Commander of the Order of the Life of the Crown of Kelantan (DJMK) - Dato' (2006)
  :
  Knight Companion of the Order of the Crown of Pahang (DIMP) - Dato' (2004)
  Grand Knight of the Order of Sultan Ahmad Shah of Pahang (SSAP) - Dato' Sri (2016)
  :
  Member of the Order of the Crown of Perlis (AMP) (2001)
  Companion of the Order of the Crown of Perlis (SMP) (2002)

On 17 August 2020, Norza was conferred the award of 'Darjah Kebesaran Panglima Setia Mahkota (PSM)' which carries the title 'Tan Sri' by the Yang di-Pertuan Agong Al-Sultan Abdullah Ri'ayatuddin Al-Mustafa Billah Shah Ibni Almarhum Sultan Haji Ahmad Shah Al-Musta'in Billah in conjunction with the birthday celebrations of Yang di-Pertuan Agong Al-Sultan Abdullah Ri'ayatuddin Al-Mustafa Billah Shah.

Earlier on 24 October 2016, he was conferred the award of ‘Darjah Sri Sultan Ahmad Shah Pahang (SSAP)’ which carries the title ‘Dato’ Sri’ by Tengku Mahkota of Pahang, Tengku Abdullah ibni Sultan Ahmad Shah in conjunction with the birthday celebrations of Sultan Ahmad Shah of Pahang.

Prior to this, Norza was conferred the award of ‘Darjah Kebesaran Seri Mahkota Wilayah (SMW)’ which carries the title ‘Datuk Seri’ by the Yang di-Pertuan Agong Almu’tasimu Billahi Muhibbuddin Tuanku AlHaj Abdul Halim Mu’adzam Shah Ibni AlMarhum Sultan Badlishah in conjunction with Federal Territory Day on 1 February 2015.

On 20 November 2021, Norza was bestowed an Honorary Doctorate in Sports Management by the Universiti Pendidikan Sultan Idris (UPSI), Tanjung Malim in conjunction with their 22nd Convocation Ceremony which was graced and officiated by Her Majesty the Chancellor, Raja Permaisuri Perak, Tuanku Zara Salim.

References 

1966 births
Living people
People from Malacca
Malaysian accountants
Malaysian people of Malay descent
Malaysian Muslims
United Malays National Organisation politicians
University of Wollongong alumni
Commanders of the Order of Loyalty to the Crown of Malaysia
Badminton executives and administrators